Laurinburg is a city in and the county seat of Scotland County, North Carolina, United States. Located in southern North Carolina near the South Carolina border, Laurinburg is southwest of Fayetteville and is home to St. Andrews University.  The population at the 2010 Census was 15,962 people.

History

Settlers arrived at the present town site around 1785. The settlement was named for a prominent family, the McLaurins. The name was originally spelled Laurinburgh and pronounced the same as Edinburgh, though the "h" was later dropped. The community was initially located within the jurisdiction of Richmond County. In 1840, Laurinburg had a saloon, a store, and a few shacks. Laurinburg High School, a private school, was established in 1852. The settlement prospered in the years following. A line of the Wilmington, Charlotte and Rutherford Railroad was built through Laurinburg in the 1850s, with the first train reaching Laurinburg in 1861. The railroad's shops were moved to Laurinburg in 1865 in the hope they would be safer from Union Army attack; however, in March of that year, Union forces reached Laurinburg and burned the railroad depot and temporary shops. The shops were later rebuilt. Laurinburg was incorporated in 1877. In 1894 the railway shops were moved out of the town and, combined with low cotton prices, property values in the area decreased and the town experienced an economic depression.

By the late 1800s Richmond County had a majority black population and tended to support the Republican Party in elections, while the state of North Carolina was dominated by the Democratic Party. As a result of this, white Democrats built up a political base in Laurinburg and in 1899 the town and the surrounding area was split off from Richmond into the new Scotland County. The town was declared the seat of Scotland County in 1900 and the first courthouse was erected the following year. As their influence in public affairs and share of public resources declined, local black citizens created the Laurinburg Normal Industrial Institute, later known as Laurinburg Academy, in 1904.

Main Street in Laurinburg was paved in 1914. Beginning in 1929, the Great Depression severely impacted Laurinburg, causing two banks to fail. A new courthouse was built in 1964. Laurinburg's downtown suffered an economic decline beginning in the 1980s when the Belk department store moved to a shopping center further away. The downtown was heavily impacted by Hurricane Florence in 2018.

Historic sites
Several sites in Laurinburg are listed on the National Register of Historic Places listings in Scotland County, North Carolina, including:

 John Blue House
 Mag Blue House
 Central School
 Dr. Evan Alexander Erwin House
 E. Hervey Evans House
 Thomas J. Gill House
 Laurel Hill Presbyterian Church
 Laurinburg Commercial Historic District
 St. Andrews University
 Stewart-Hawley-Malloy House
 Laurinburg Institute
 Villa Nova

Geography

Climate

Demographics

2020 census

As of the 2020 United States Census, there were 14,978 people, 5,712 households, and 3,544 families residing in the city. The black population is concentrated in the northern section of the city.

2000 census

As of the census of 2000, there were 15,874 people, 6,136 households, and 4,221 families residing in the city. The population density was 1,280.2 people per square mile (494.3/km2). There were 6,603 housing units at an average density of 532.5 per square mile (205.6/km2). The racial makeup of the city was 50.54% White, 43.06% African American, 4.23% Native American, 0.76% Asian, 0.03% Pacific Islander, 0.35% from other races, and 1.04% from two or more races. Hispanic or Latino of any race were 1.06% of the population.

There were 6,136 households, out of which 32.1% had children under the age of 18 living with them, 41.8% were married couples living together, 23.2% had a female householder with no husband present, and 31.2% were non-families. 27.9% of all households were made up of individuals, and 11.0% had someone living alone who was 65 years of age or older. The average household size was 2.46 and the average family size was 3.00.

In the city, the population was spread out, with 26.6% under the age of 18, 10.7% from 18 to 24, 25.9% from 25 to 44, 22.7% from 45 to 64, and 14.1% who were 65 years of age or older. The median age was 36 years. For every 100 females, there were 81.2 males. For every 100 females age 18 and over, there were 74.7 males.

The median income for a household in the city was $29,064, and the median income for a family was $37,485. Males had a median income of $31,973 versus $25,243 for females. The per capita income for the city was $16,165. About 19.7% of families and 23.6% of the population were below the poverty line, including 35.5% of those under age 18 and 18.6% of those age 65 or over.

The state Scotland Correctional Institution, located near the airport, opened in 2003.

Education

High school
 Scotland High School

College
The city is home to St. Andrews University, formerly known as St. Andrews Presbyterian College.

Media
Laurinburg is served by the local newspaper, The Laurinburg Exchange.

The local radio station is WLNC.

Notable people
 Russ Adams, former MLB infielder for the Toronto Blue Jays
 Megan Brigman, former professional women's soccer player
 Brent Butler, former MLB infielder
 Bucky Covington, country musician and American Idol Season 5 finalist
 Wes Covington, former MLB outfielder
 Robert Dozier, professional basketball player
 Lorinza Harrington, former NBA player
 Joseph Roswell Hawley, four-term U.S. Senator, two-term U.S. Congressman, Governor of Connecticut, and Union Army Major General
 Harriet McBryde Johnson, activist for the disabled
 Samantha Joye, oceanographer known for her work studying the Deepwater Horizon Oil Spill
 Terrell Manning, NFL player
 William S. McArthur, former United States Army colonel and NASA astronaut
 Bejun Mehta, countertenor
 James Dickson Phillips Jr., United States Court of Appeals judge
 William R. Purcell, physician and politician
 Travian Robertson, NFL defensive end
 Kelvin Sampson, college basketball coach
 Terry Sanford, former Governor of North Carolina and U.S. Senator
 Charlie Scott, NBA All-Star and University of North Carolina at Chapel Hill player, Olympic gold medalist in 1968, and valedictorian at Laurinburg Institute
 Woody Shaw, hard-bop (jazz) trumpeter
 Franklin Stubbs, MLB player
 Hilee Taylor, NFL defensive end
 Leonard Thompson, PGA Tour golfer
 Ben Vereen, actor, dancer, and singer
 Jacoby Watkins, former NFL cornerback and North Carolina football player
 Zamir White, NFL Running Back, Las Vegas Raiders

Sister cities
Laurinburg has one sister city, as designated by Sister Cities International:
  Oban, Argyll and Bute, Scotland

See also
 List of municipalities in North Carolina

References

Bibliography

Further reading
 Graham, Gael, "'The Lexington of White Supremacy': School and Local Politics in Late-Nineteenth-Century Laurinburg, North Carolina," North Carolina Historical Review, 89 (Jan. 2012), 27–58.

External links

 
 Laurinburg-Scotland County Area Chamber of Commerce

Cities in North Carolina
Cities in Scotland County, North Carolina
County seats in North Carolina